The White Sewing Machine Company was a sewing machine company founded in 1858  in Templeton, Massachusetts, by Thomas H. White and  based in Cleveland, Ohio, since 1866.

History 
Founded as the White Manufacturing Company it took the White Sewing Machine Company name when it was incorporated in 1876. White Sewing Machines won numerous awards at international expositions, including the 1889 Universelle Exposition in Paris. White began supplying sewing machines to Sears Roebuck and Co in the 1920s. By the 1930s, all Sears sewing machines were Whites rebadged as Kenmore, Franklin, Minnesota, and other house brands. A White Rotary Electric Series 77 machine was placed in the Crypt of Civilization.

White Motor Company  
In 1900, Thomas White's son, Rollin, developed a steam engine, using a corner of one of his father's factories to start building automobiles. In 1906 the automotive venture was spun off as its own company, the White Motor Company. By 1923, the White Sewing Machine Company had divested all side ventures to focus solely on sewing machines and accessories.

Later History  
By the early 1950s, however, White was losing money amid a flood of cheaper imported sewing machines and the loss of a supplier contract from Sears, which had represented 40 percent of White's business. Edward Reddig became company president in 1955, and he led an aggressive campaign of shifting manufacturing overseas, slashing domestic manufacturing and diversification. White moved heavily into appliances, tools and machinery, acquiring appliance brands such as Kelvinator (from American Motors), Gibson, Philco (from Ford Motor Company/GTE) and Franklin (private label supplier, from Studebaker-Worthington). To reflect this, the company renamed itself name White Consolidated Industries (WCI) in 1964. WCI purchased Westinghouse's major appliance business in 1975, which resulted in creation of the White-Westinghouse brand name. In 1979, WCI bought the Frigidaire appliance line from General Motors.

WCI was acquired by Electrolux in 1986.

In 2006 Electrolux spun off a number of its lines under the Husqvarna (including variations of the Husqvarna) brand name. The White line of sewing machines was consolidated into the lower end Husqvarna Viking brand after this spinoff. The White-Westinghouse brand name remained with Electrolux and that name is the only remnant of the "White Sewing Machine Company" name, however the brand line included no sewing machines.

New White-branded sewing machines models have not been manufactured since the Husqvarna spinoff in 2006. Singer, Husqvarna Viking and Pfaff brands are now all owned by SVP Worldwide. Though not advertised, SVP provides all of their user manuals for all of their brands including the "White" brand through the Singer brand website.

Notable Sewing Machine Models 
 White Sewing Machine (also known as the White Vibrating Shuttle or the White VS)
 White Family Rotary (later called the White Rotary)

See also 

 List of sewing machine brands
 White Motor Company
 Whitin Machine Works

Notes

References

External links
 
 History of White Consolidated Industries
 The Encyclopedia of Cleveland History, WHITE CONSOLIDATED INDUSTRIES, INC.

Electrolux brands
Home appliance manufacturers of the United States
Manufacturing companies based in Cleveland
History of Massachusetts
History of Ohio
Sewing machine brands
1858 establishments in Massachusetts
White Consolidated Industries